During the 2007–08 season Peterborough United finished as runners-up in Football League Two.

Sponsors

Squad

Goalkeepers

Defenders

Midfielders

Forwards

Transfers

A transfer between 1 June 2007 & 31 May 2008

In

Out

Fixtures and results

Friendlies

Football League Two

FA Cup

League Cup

Football League Trophy

Statistics

Goal scorers

Cards

See also
 2007–08 Football League

References

Peterborough United F.C. seasons
Peterborough United